Jorge Carlos Santos Moreira Baptista (born 2 April 1977) is a Portuguese former professional footballer who played as a goalkeeper.

Club career
Born in Mafamude, Vila Nova de Gaia, Porto District, Baptista spent the vast majority of his senior career in the lower levels of Portuguese football. In the Primeira Liga he represented, as a starter, G.D. Estoril Praia and Gil Vicente FC (suffering relegation with both, although only due to irregularities in the second case), being a backup at Leixões S.C. and Associação Naval 1º de Maio.

In late January 2011, aged nearly 34, Baptista returned to former club Gil Vicente, with the Barcelos-based club now in the second division.

References

External links

1977 births
Living people
Sportspeople from Vila Nova de Gaia
Portuguese footballers
Association football goalkeepers
Primeira Liga players
Liga Portugal 2 players
Segunda Divisão players
S.C. Dragões Sandinenses players
S.C. Espinho players
G.D. Estoril Praia players
Gil Vicente F.C. players
Leixões S.C. players
Associação Naval 1º de Maio players
S.C. Covilhã players
S.C. Freamunde players
C.D. Trofense players